Vincent Sowah Odotei is a Ghanaian politician and the Member of Parliament of La Dadekotopon in the Greater Accra Region of Ghana. He is a member of the New Patriotic Party was the deputy minister for communications in Ghana until his appointment was terminated on April 6, 2020, by President Nana Akufo-Addo.

He defeated Hon. Nii Amasah Namoale in the 2016 elections.

Early life and education 
Vincent Odotei was born on 5 May 1968 in Accra. He holds a B.A from the University of Ghana and Post Graduate Diploma from Graduate School of Business University of Strathclyde Scotland.

Current involvement 
Vincent Sowah Odotei was at the just ended World Summit Awards Grand Jury held in Accra, Ghana held from November 3, 2018, to November 7, 2018, where he expressed his ministry's willingness to partner the private sector for development.

References

Ghanaian sportspeople
Ghanaian MPs 2017–2021
Living people
New Patriotic Party politicians
People from Greater Accra Region
Government ministers of Ghana
Year of birth missing (living people)
Ghanaian football chairmen and investors